The Antofagasta Chile Temple is a temple of the Church of Jesus Christ of Latter-day Saints under construction in Antofagasta, Chile.

History
The intent to construct the temple was announced by church president Russell M. Nelson on April 7, 2019. The Antofagasta Chile Temple was announced concurrently with 7 other temples. At the time, the number of operating or announced temples was 162.

On November 27, 2020, a groundbreaking to signify beginning of construction was held, with Elder Juan Pablo Villar, a General Authority Seventy and a member of the South America South Area Presidency, presiding.  This will be the third temple in Chile.

See also

 The Church of Jesus Christ of Latter-day Saints in Chile
 Comparison of temples of The Church of Jesus Christ of Latter-day Saints
 List of temples of The Church of Jesus Christ of Latter-day Saints
 List of temples of The Church of Jesus Christ of Latter-day Saints by geographic region
 Temple architecture (Latter-day Saints)

References

External links
Antofagasta Chile Temple Official announcement
Antofagasta Chile Temple at ChurchofJesusChristTemples.org

Temples (LDS Church) in Chile
Proposed religious buildings and structures of the Church of Jesus Christ of Latter-day Saints
The Church of Jesus Christ of Latter-day Saints in Chile
Proposed buildings and structures in Chile
21st-century Latter Day Saint temples